Mount Cronin is a mountain in the Babine Range of the Skeena Mountains in northern British Columbia, Canada, located at the head of Cronin Creek in Babine Mountains Provincial Park just northeast of Smithers. The mountain was named after James Cronin, who operated a mine on this mountain in the 19th century.

References

Two-thousanders of British Columbia
Skeena Mountains
Range 5 Coast Land District